Donetsk State Academic Opera and Ballet Theatre named after A. Solovyanenko was established in 1932 in Donetsk on the basis of fit-up theatre of Right-bank Ukraine. Since 15 March 1932 the theatre was transferred to Donetsk theatre group The first season opened on September 1, 1932 with opera Prince Igor composed by Alexander Borodin. On April 12, 1941, the Theatre opened the season in the new theater building by premiere of Mikhail Glinka's Ivan Susanin. On August 7, same year, the premiere of the first ballet performance Laurencia by Alexander Crain was held.

After the outbreak of the Great Patriotic War part of the company was evacuated to Kirghizia, later, in June 1942, the theater moved to Przhevalsk city, where actors held concerts in hospitals and military units. In January 1944 the theater returned to Stalino and already in September, right after the liberation of the Donets Basin a premiere of Alexander Borodin's Prince Igor took place.

On October 2, 1977, the Theater was awarded with Academic status for significant contribution to the development of Soviet art. 
In 1992 the Choreographic School of Vadim Pisarev, the People's Artist of Ukraine, was established in the Theater. Starting from 1994 the Theater has been hosting the International Festival "World Ballet Stars", Vadim Pisarev is as well the founder and art director.

On December 9, 1999 by the Resolution of the Cabinet of Ministers of Ukraine, the theater was named after Soviet Ukrainian opera singer Anatoliy Solovyanenko.

Architecture 

The theatre building was initially designed for drama theatre, construction works started in 1936. Ludwig Kotovskiy was the leading architect and overall management of construction project was scheduled by Solomon Krol'. 
The theater building is made in classic style. On three sides approaches to the theater are organized. The auditorium and the lobby are decorated with stucco details. Initially, the auditorium was designed for 1300 seats, at the present time there are 976. Above the mezzanine and balcony of the auditorium, as well as in some niches of the foyer there are sculptural busts of composers, poets and decorative vases.
The theater is equipped with mechanized stage, the main stage area is 560 m2. It can withstand the load of up to 75 tons.

The troupe 

Many famous artists started their career in Donetsk Opera and Ballet Theatre, among them Yuri Gulayev, Anatoliy Solovyanenko, Nickolay Momot, Valentin Zemlyanskiy, Alexander Korobeychenko and others - they were the People's artists of Ukraine. The Theatre was named after prominent opera tenor Anatoliy Solovyanenko, awardee of Taras Shevchenko and Lenin Prizes, who was born in Donetsk. In different years on the stage of Donetsk Opera and Ballet Theatre such stars of Soviet Union art danced and sang, as Ivan Kozlovsky and Sergei Lemeshev, Maria Bieshu, Olga Lepeshinskaya, Marina Semenova, Klavdiya Shulzhenko and many others. 
Current troupe of the Theatre includes:

Management 
 Director - Honoured Artist of Ukraine Vasiliy Ryabenkiy
 Art Director - People's Artist of Ukraine Vadim Pisarev
 Chief Choirmaster - People's Artist of Ukraine Ludmila Streltsova
 Chief choreographer - People's Artist of Ukraine Evgeniya Hasyanova
 Chief conductor - Honoured Artist of Ukraine Vasily Vasilenko

Opera 
 People's Artist of Ukraine's Tamara Lagunova (since 1977)
 People's Artist of Ukraine Valentin Zemlyanskiy
 People's Artist of Ukraine Nickolay Momot (since 1969)
 Honored Artist of Ukraine Kaleria Kamenyanova
 Honored Artist of Ukraine Petr Labatiy
 Honored Artist of Ukraine, Anatoly Voronin
 Honored Artist of Ukraine Vasily Sorokin (since 1966)

Ballet 
 Anastasia Aseyeva
 Svetlana Bednenko
 Roman Belgorodskiy
 Yekaterina Botaikina
 Inna Dorofeieva
 Maxim Valchik
 Irina Komarenko, Honored Artist of Ukraine
 Yulia Polgorodnik, Honored Artist of Ukraine

and many others.

See also 
Donetsk
Donetsk National Academic Ukrainian Musical and Drama Theatre

References

External links
  
 Former website archived on 25 January 2013
 Old pictures of the Theatre
 Anatoliy Solovyanenko biography 

Theatres in Donetsk
Buildings and structures in Donetsk
Tourist attractions in Donetsk Oblast
Opera houses in Ukraine
Music venues completed in 1941
Theatres completed in 1941
Culture in Donetsk